Line Vennesland (born 6 February 1985) is a Norwegian politician for the Labour Party.

She served as a deputy representative to the Parliament of Norway from Aust-Agder during the terms 2009–2013 and 2013–2017.

She has been a member of Evje og Hornnes municipal council and Aust-Agder county council.

References

1985 births
Living people
People from Evje og Hornnes
Deputy members of the Storting
Labour Party (Norway) politicians
Aust-Agder politicians
Women members of the Storting
21st-century Norwegian politicians